

List of possibly extinct birds

IUCN Red List bird species that are listed as "Possibly Extinct"  
Common Name - Scientific Name - Distribution - Year of last confirmed recording
 Pink-headed Duck - Rhodonessa caryophyllacea - Bangladesh; India; Myanmar - 1935
 Jamaican Petrel - Pterodroma caribbaea - Bahamas; Dominica; Guadeloupe; Jamaica - 1879
 Guadalupe Storm-petrel - Hydrobates macrodactylus - Mexico - 1912
 Samoan Moorhen - Pareudiastes pacificus - Samoa - 1873
 New Caledonian Buttonquail - Turnix novaecaledoniae - New Caledonia - 1911 (single record)
 Javan Lapwing - Vanellus macropterus - Indonesia (Jawa) - 1940
 Eskimo Curlew - Numenius borealis - Americas - 1963
 Siau Scops-owl - Otus siaoensis - Indonesia - 1866 (single record)
 Pernambuco Pygmy-owl - Glaucidium mooreorum - Brazil - 2001
 New Caledonian Nightjar - Eurostopodus exul - New Caledonia - 1939 (single record)
 Jamaican Poorwill - Siphonorhis americana - Jamaica - 1860
 Turquoise-throated Puffleg - Eriocnemis godini - Ecuador - 1850
 Ivory-billed Woodpecker - Campephilus principalis - United States & Cuba - 1944 & 1987
 Imperial Woodpecker - Campephilus imperialis - Mexico - 1956
 New Caledonian Lorikeet - Charmosyna diadema - New Caledonia
 Sinu Parakeet - Pyrrhura subandina - Colombia - 1949
 Glaucous Macaw - Anodorhynchus glaucus - South America - 1936 (zoo specimen)
 South Island Kokako - Callaeas cinereus - New Zealand - 2007
 Ua Pou Monarch - Pomarea mira - French Polynesia - 1975
 Olomao - Myadestes lanaiensis - Hawaii - 1980
 Oahu Alauahio - Paroreomyza maculate - Hawaii -  1985
 Ou - Psittirostra psittacea - Hawaii - 1989
 Kauai Nukupuu - Hemignathus Hanapepe - Hawaii - 1899
 Maui Nukupuu - Hemignathus affinis - Hawaii - 1994
 Maui Akepa - Loxops ochraceus - Hawaii - 1988
 Bachman's Warbler - Vermivora bachmanii - Cuba; United States - 1988

References

Further reading 
IUCN Red List version 2020-3. The IUCN Red List of Threatened Species. International Union for Conservation of Nature and Natural Resources (IUCN). Retrieved January 2022.
Birdlife Data Zone 
The Cornell Lab of Ornithology, The Clements Checklist of Birds of the World, 6th Edition 
IOC World Bird List Version 12.1 
Rewild.org Lost Birds 
EDGE of Existence 
List of critically endangered birds 
Possibly extinct
Possibly extinct